Igor Tõnurist (11 February 1947 – 8 January 2021) was an Estonian ethnographer and folklorist.

In 1969 he graduated from Moscow University in history and ethnography specialities.

He was the leader of several folklore groups, e.g. Leegajus, and Seto folklore collective Sõsarõ.

Topics of research: Estonian national costume, Estonian folk instruments.

Awards

 2003: Order of the White Star, IV class.

References

1947 births
2021 deaths
Estonian folklorists
Moscow State University alumni
People from Keila
Recipients of the Order of the White Star, 4th Class